6-Carboxyfluorescein (6-FAM) is a fluorescent dye with an absorption wavelength of 495 nm and an emission wavelength of 517 nm. A carboxyfluorescein molecule is a fluorescein molecule with a carboxyl group added. They are commonly used as a tracer agents. It is used in the sequencing of nucleic acids and in the labeling of nucleotides.

Commercially available FAM is a mixture of two isomers, 5-FAM and 6-FAM, and the correct name is 5(6)-carboxyfluorescein.

The dyes are membrane-impermeant and can be loaded into cells by microinjection or scrape loading.  It can be incorporated into liposomes, and allows for the tracking of liposomes as they pass through the body.  In addition, carboxyfluorescein has been used to track division of cells. In vascular plants, 5(6)-carboxyfluorescein can be used as a symplastic tracer. It is able to move through the phloem due to its structural similarity to sucrose. It is typically loaded into the leaves in order to gain access to the phloem. This can be done by scraping, cutting, or weakening the leaf’s cuticle with an herbicide. 

Popular derivatives for cell tracing purposes are carboxyfluorescein diacetate succinimidyl ester (CFDA-SE) and carboxyfluorescein succinimidyl ester (CFSE).

See also
Fluorescein

References

Fluorone dyes
Benzoic acids
Dicarboxylic acids
Triarylmethane dyes